The coal seams worked in the South Yorkshire Coalfield lie mainly in the middle coal measures within what is now formally referred to as the Pennine Coal Measures Group. These are a series of mudstones, shales, sandstones, and coal seams laid down towards the end of the Carboniferous period between about 320 and 300 million years ago.

The list of coal seams that follows starts at the shallowest seam and proceeds downwards with the outcrops occurring progressively further west until the deepest coal seam, the Silkstone Seam which outcropped at the western edge of the coalfield.

The thicknesses and depths of each seam are not given as they vary across the coalfield.

Seams

Sources

Further reading

External links 
 Yorkshire Coalfield Geology - with depths of the seams at Kiveton, and a map showing the depth of the Barnsley Seam across the coalfield; see also depths of the seams at Dinnington  and Thurcroft .

Geology of South Yorkshire
Mining in South Yorkshire